Valsna or Walasna is a former minor princely state, and presumably its eponymous seat, in Gujarat, western India.

History 
The Fifth Class state and taluka in Mahi Kantha comprised ten villages, covering 21 square miles.

It had a combined population of 2,749 in 1901, yielding a state revenue of 5,953 Rupees (mostly from land), paying a tribute of 280 Rupees to the Gaekwar Baroda State.

Rulers 
Its rulers were styled Thakur

 1812 - ....   Nathu Singh 
 c.1880        Man Singh     (b. 1850 - d. ....) 
 .... - 1926   Hamir Singh   (b. 1881 - d. 1926)
 1926 - 1947   Shiv Singh    (b. 1910).
Thakore Sahib Shri Badrinarayansinh
Kunwar Sahib Shri Satyanarayansinh Rathore

External links and Sources 
 Imperial Gazetteer, on DSAL - Mahi Kantha
 WorldStatesmen - India - Princely States K-Z, with flag

Princely states of Gujarat
Rajput princely states